Baltasound (or Baltasund) is the largest settlement on the island of Unst in Shetland, Scotland. It comes from the Old Norse man's name Balti (Baltisund). Unst is the most northerly inhabited island in the United Kingdom. The village lies halfway along the island's east coast on a sheltered bay called Balta Sound.

Baltasound was formerly the most important herring port in Shetland. In 1902 its catch exceeded that of the Shetland capital Lerwick. The herring trade declined rapidly after 1905 but the physical remains of the herring boom remained long after.

Baltasound was the home of the noted Victorian botanist Thomas Edmondston, who was born at Buness House where his uncle, also called Thomas, was the laird. A memorial stone erected outside the house by the elder Thomas Edmondston commemorates scientific studies undertaken there by the French physicist Jean-Baptiste Biot.

Baltasound can also lay claim to the most northerly "wood" in the British Isles, although it is not very substantial.

Amenities

Many of Baltasound's current amenities hold the record for the most northerly in the UK:

Airport - Unst/Baltasound Airport - Airport code UNT, runway length ., currently only used by emergency services.
Leisure centre
School - Baltasound Junior High School
Hotel - The Baltasound Hotel
Post office - Baltasound Post Office is the most northerly post office in the United Kingdom. For many years, this record was held by the post office at Haroldswick until it closed down in 1999.
The Unst Bus Shelter, known locally as "Bobby's Bus Shelter", is a famous bus shelter and bus stop near the village. It is maintained by the Shetland Islands Council.

A 2 foot 6 inch gauge railway was built from the chromate quarries at Hagdale to Baltasound in 1907 to boost the Chromate industry on the island. Although the railway did not operate a passenger service, it helped the village economically and financially. Like other narrow gauge railways in the Shetland Islands, it did not survive.

Climate
Baltasound is home to the most northerly Met Office weather station in the United Kingdom. Similar to fellow Shetland station Lerwick, Baltasound experiences a cool oceanic climate  that borders a subpolar climate (Koppen: Cfb and Cfc, respectively), with winters that are mild for the latitude, and short, cool summers. Precipitation is abundant and occurs year-round.

Baltasound holds the record for the highest temperature recorded in the Shetland Islands:  on 2 July 1958. It also possibly holds the record for the lowest Shetland temperature:  on 5 February 2001.

During the summer solstice, Baltasound experiences what is known as civil polar day, where the sun sets in the evening and rises the next morning, but between these times it does not get completely dark. During the winter solstice the sun also fails to reach 6° above the horizon, classified as solar twilight.

References

External links

Baltasound pictures on official Unst website

Villages in Unst